Mongolia – United Kingdom relations are bilateral relations between the United Kingdom of Great Britain and Northern Ireland and Mongolia

History
In 1963, the United Kingdom was the first Western country to establish diplomatic ties with Mongolia. In July 1989, Punsalmaagiin Ochirbat visited the United Kingdom and the two nations signed economic agreements.

Both countries have described their relationship as "close". The Prime Minister of Mongolia last visited the UK in July 2015, where he addressed Asia House. Hugo Swire also addressed Asia House and praised Mongolia's investments in tackling climate change and the abolition of the death penalty in 2012, describing Mongolia as a "a leading voice among its neighbours"

Assistance and relationship
The United Kingdom has an embassy in Ulaanbaatar, while Mongolia has an embassy in London. The United Kingdom is the consular responsible for a number of EU and Commonwealth citizens. Philip Malone has served as British Ambassador since 2018, while Enkhsukh Battumur has served as Mongolian Ambassador since 2022.

Trade and investment ties are strong and fast-growing. British-Australian company Rio Tinto is operating the Oyu Tolgoi mine, one of the largest in the world. Around 7,000 British citizens visit Mongolia each year and around 4,000 Mongolians are resident in the UK.

See also
Embassy of Mongolia, London

References

 
Bilateral relations of the United Kingdom
United Kingdom